Palaeomicroides aritai is a species of moth belonging to the family Micropterigidae. It was described by Satoshi Hashimoto in 1996. It is endemic to Taiwan. It is named after collector of the holotype, professor Yutaka Arita.

The length of the forewings is 4.3 mm for the holotype, a male.

References

Micropterigidae
Moths of Taiwan
Endemic fauna of Taiwan
Moths described in 1996